Mylène Farmer is a French pop singer-songwriter that has released eleven studio albums, five compilation albums two of which are remixes ones, six live albums, sixty-six singles and seventeen home videos. She is referred to as the "Queen of French Pop" and has sold over 45 million records throughout her career. Farmer was the first female artist in history to sell out the 80,000 capacity Stade de France two nights in a row. Ainsi soit je... was the best-selling album by a woman during the 80s decade in France. Les mots is the highest-selling greatest hits collection in French history. "Désenchantée" remains as the best-selling single by a female artist in France. Farmer has achieved 21 No. 1 hits including 58 Top 10 hits on SNEP, spending 39 weeks atop the chart (behind Céline Dion for any artists), and 15 No. 1 albums including a staggering 8 diamond-certified albums in France.

Her debut album, Cendres de lune, was released in April 1986 and contained her first hit single, "Libertine". The album was re-released in 1987 with "Tristana", another top ten single in France. On the French Albums Chart, Cendres de lune debuted in 1989, after the success of Farmer's second album, and peaked at number 39 in June 1989. In April 1988, Farmer released her second album, Ainsi soit je.... Thanks to her first number-one single in France, "Pourvu qu'elles soient douces", the album topped the chart as well for two weeks in December 1988. It also contained three more hits: "Sans contrefaçon", "Ainsi soit je..." and "Sans logique". The album was certified Diamond in France and has sold 1.5 million copies there. It was followed by Farmer's first live album, En concert, which was released in December 1989 and became her second top ten album in France, reaching number nine in February 1990. Farmer's third studio album, L'autre..., was released in April 1991, led by her best-selling single, "Désenchantée", which topped the French Singles Chart for nine weeks and also charted in several other countries. The album spawned three more top ten hits: "Regrets", "Je t'aime mélancolie", and "Beyond My Control". With twenty weeks atop of the French chart, Diamond certification and 1.8 million copies sold, L'autre... became Farmer's most successful album to date.

Her next studio album, Anamorphosée, was released in October 1995, led by the number-one single, "XXL". It topped the French Albums Chart for two weeks in January 1997 and was certified Diamond in 2009, selling 1.1 million copies. To promote the album, Farmer embarked on a tour in 1996, which was recorded and released as Live à Bercy in May 1997, reaching number two on the albums chart. Farmer's fifth studio album, Innamoramento, was released in April 1999. Although it narrowly missed reaching the top spot (stalling at number two), it has sold 1.1 million copies and achieved Diamond status. The album provided five top ten hits, including "L'Âme-stram-gram", "Souviens-toi du jour" and the title track - all of which made the top five. Farmer's next live album, Mylenium Tour, was released in December 2000 and topped the chart for one week. In November 2001, Farmer released her first greatest hits album entitled Les mots. It became one of the best-selling compilation albums of all time in France with approximately 1.5 million copies sold. The album also contained some new material, including the songs: "Les mots" (duet with Seal), "C'est une belle journée" and "Pardonne-moi", all of which became top ten hits in France. Farmer's sixth and seventh studio albums, Avant que l'ombre... and Point de suture, were released respectively in April 2005 and in August 2008, reaching number one. Point de suture gave Farmer five number-one singles. In addition, she released two commercially successful DVDs of her 2006 and 2009 tours, Avant que l'ombre... à Bercy and N°5 on Tour.

Farmer's eighth studio album Bleu noir, released in December 2010, topped the chart and was certified Diamond in France. The lead single of the album, "Oui mais... non", topped the chart in France as well. The next two singles, "Bleu noir" and "Lonely Lisa", also reached number one. A greatest hits album titled 2001.2011 was released in December 2011 and debuted at number three on the French Albums Chart. In November 2012, Farmer released her ninth studio album, Monkey Me, which debuted at number one and spawned three singles: chart-topping "À l'ombre", and "Je te dis tout" and "Monkey Me", both peaking at number three. The album was supported by the tour, which led to the recording and release of the live album and video, Timeless 2013. In November 2015, Farmer's tenth studio album Interstellaires was released, with "Stolen Car", a duet with Sting, as lead single. Both debuted at number one on the French charts. In September 2018, Farmer released her eleventh studio album, Désobéissance, which topped the chart. Singles from Désobéissance also topped the sales chart, giving Farmer her twentieth number-ones there.

Albums

Studio albums

Live albums

Compilation albums

Notes

Singles

Commercial singles

Notes

Promotional singles and other charted songs

Notes

Home videos

Notes

References 

Discography
Discographies of French artists
Pop music discographies